Allentown Mill is a historic grist mill located at 42 South Main Street in Allentown of Monmouth County, New Jersey. The mill was built in 1855, replacing the original mill built here by Nathan Allen in 1706. It was added to the National Register of Historic Places on February 14, 1978 for its significance in agriculture, commerce, and industry.

See also
National Register of Historic Places listings in Monmouth County, New Jersey

References

External links
 
Official website

Industrial buildings completed in 1855
Buildings and structures in Monmouth County, New Jersey
Commercial buildings on the National Register of Historic Places in New Jersey
National Register of Historic Places in Monmouth County, New Jersey
Allentown, New Jersey
New Jersey Register of Historic Places